Zoe Rebecca Britcliffe (born 15 September 2001) is an Australian cricketer who plays as a right-arm medium pace bowler and right-handed batter for Western Australia in the Women's National Cricket League (WNCL). She made her WNCL debut on 17 February 2021 against Tasmania.

References

External links

2001 births
Living people
Sportspeople from Ipswich, Queensland
Australian women cricketers
Western Australia women cricketers